Butterwick is a small village in County Durham, England.
 It is situated a short distance to the south east of Fishburn.

Butterwick is first mentioned in 1131, when it is called "Boterwyck" meaning the butter or dairy farm. The West, South and East Butterwick Farms of today are the surviving remains of this small medieval village, the earthwork remains of which still survive in and around the modern farm buildings.

References

Villages in County Durham
Sedgefield